is a railway station of Kyushu Railway Company located in Uki, Kumamoto, Japan.

Railway stations in Kumamoto Prefecture
Railway stations in Japan opened in 1895